Temperance is the self-titled first full-length album by the Italian modern melodic metal band Temperance. The album also contains a cover version of Christina Perri's "A Thousand Years".

Track listing

Personnel
Temperance
Giulio Capone – drums, keyboards
Sandro Capone – guitars, vocals (backing)
Chiara Tricarico – vocals (female)
Luca Negro – bass
Marco Pastorino – guitars (lead), vocals (backing), vocals (harsh)
Crew
Simone Mularoni – mixing, mastering
Gustavo Sazes – artwork

Music videos
"Breathe"

References

Temperance (Italian band) albums
2014 debut albums
Scarlet Records albums